Boxing in Australia refers to the sport of boxing held in Australia.

History
The influential traditional martial arts, olympic wrestling and brazilian jiu-jitsu have shaped MMA in Australia, along with the combat sports of boxing and kickboxing/muay thai.

Sanctioning
The states and territories of Australia have different sanctioning bodies and rules. Sanctioning bodies include: Combat Sports Authority (NSW) and the Professional Boxing and Combat Sports Board  (Victoria).

Governing Body
Boxing Australia is the national sporting body that runs amateur boxing in Australia and Australian National Boxing Federation which governs Professional boxing in Australia.

Tournaments
Boxing at the 1938 British Empire Games
Boxing at the 1956 Summer Olympics
Boxing at the 1962 British Empire and Commonwealth Games
Boxing at the 1982 Commonwealth Games
1991 World Amateur Boxing Championships
Boxing at the 2000 Summer Olympics
Boxing at the 2006 Commonwealth Games
2012 Oceania Boxing Olympic Qualification Tournament

Current Champions

Male Champions
This table showing the male boxers who have won the Australian professional championship.

Female Champions

This table showing the female boxers who have won the Australian professional championship.

See also

List of boxing organisations
Professional boxing in New Zealand

References

External links
Aus-Boxing Official website
Australian National Boxing Federation Official website
Boxing Australia Official website
Australian Boxing Central Official website